Willie James Mabon (October 24, 1925 – April 19, 1985) was an American R&B singer, songwriter and pianist, who had two number one hits on the Billboard R&B chart: "I Don't Know" in 1952 and "I'm Mad" in 1953.

Career
Mabon was born and brought up in the Hollywood district of Memphis, Tennessee. He moved to Chicago in 1942, by which time he had become known as a singer and pianist. He formed a group, the Blues Rockers, and in 1949 began recording for Aristocrat Records and then Chess Records.

His biggest success came in 1952 when his debut solo release, "I Don't Know", written by Cripple Clarence Lofton (who received no royalties), topped the Billboard R&B chart for eight weeks.
It was one of the most popular releases of its era and was Chess's biggest hit before the successes of Chuck Berry and Bo Diddley. It was also one of the first R&B hit records to be covered by a leading white artist, Tennessee Ernie Ford. Mabon's original was played on Alan Freed's early radio shows and also sold well to white audiences, crossing over markets at the start of the rock-and-roll era.

Mabon returned to the top R&B slot in 1953 with "I'm Mad" and had another hit in 1954 with the Mel London song "Poison Ivy". However, his career failed to maintain its momentum, and record releases in the late 1950s on various labels were largely unsuccessful. Releases in the 1960s included "I'm the Fixer" and "Got to Have Some".

He moved to Paris in 1972 and toured and recorded in Europe as part of the promoter Jim Simpson's "American Blues Legends" tour, recording The Comeback for Simpson's Big Bear Records and an album for Ornament Records in 1977.  He also performed at the Montreux Jazz Festival. He died in April 1985, after a long illness, in Paris.

See also
 List of Chicago blues musicians
 List of artists who reached number one on the Billboard R&B chart

References

External links
 AllMusic.com

1925 births
1985 deaths
American rhythm and blues musicians
Chicago blues musicians
American blues pianists
American male pianists
Songwriters from Tennessee
Musicians from Memphis, Tennessee
Chess Records artists
American expatriates in France
American blues singers
Blues musicians from Tennessee
Songwriters from Illinois
20th-century American pianists
Parrot Records artists
Apollo Records artists
African-American male songwriters
African-American pianists
20th-century African-American male singers